Sturgis High School was a public secondary school located in Sturgis, Mississippi. Until 1970, it was a school for white children only; black children were bused  to the black Maben High School. It was a part of the Oktibbeha County School District, and was later merged with Maben High School to form West Oktibbeha County High School.

In 2015 the schools of Oktibbeha County district consolidated into the Starkville Oktibbeha Consolidated School District, and West Oktibbeha consolidated into Starkville High School.

Notable people
Kirby Jackson, NFL football player went to Sturgis High School.

References

External links
 
 
 

Schools in Oktibbeha County, Mississippi
Public high schools in Mississippi
2015 disestablishments in Mississippi
Educational institutions disestablished in 2015
Defunct schools in Mississippi
Education in Oktibbeha County, Mississippi